Galesh Pol (also Romanized as Gālesh Pol) is a village in Ahlamerestaq-e Jonubi Rural District, in the Central District of Mahmudabad County, Mazandaran Province, Iran. At the 2006 census, its population was 1,218, in 334 families.

References 

Populated places in Mahmudabad County